Nawab Sayyid Abdullah Khan I also known as Sayyid Mian I, was the father of Syed Hassan Ali Khan and Syed Hussain Ali Khan the two famous Sayyid Brothers. His full name was Sayyid Abdullah Khan Tihanpuri, Tihanpur was the ancestral village of this branch of Sayyids in Patiala Punjab.

Sayyid Mian, was a loyal serviceman of Aurangzeb, he became famous as a commander during the Siege of Bijapur for planning the trenches and leading assaults during the Siege of Bijapur. Due to his services he was appointed the first Mughal Subahdar of Bijapur.

Ancestry 

Abdullah Khan was a member of the Barha Dynasty. The meaning of the name Barha is uncertain. While some contend that it comes from the word, "bahir", meaning "outsider" referring to the preference of members of the Barha dynasty to live outside Delhi. Others like the Emperor Jahangir, believed that it came from the Hindi word, "barha", meaning "twelve". In reference to the twelve townships that members of the dynasty had received as fiefs from Sultan Shibabdudin of Ghor when they first arrived in India.

The dynasty descends in the male line from the fourth Rashidun Caliph, Ali, through his younger son Hussain who married Shahrbanu, herself a daughter of the Sassanian emperor of Persia, Yazdegard III. Due to Ali's status as an Adnanite, the dynasty can trace its ancestry to Abraham through his eldest son Ishmael.

In Arabia, Abdullah Khan's ancestors took part in many rebellions against Abbasid authority. One ancestor, Isa bin Zayd, revolted against the Caliph Al Mahdi and was consequently poisoned by that caliph at the age of 45. Subsequently, the dynasty were heavily persecuted by the Abbasid government, and eventually the founder of the Barha dynasty, Abul Farah Al Wasiti, fled from Madina to Wasit and from there he fled to the Ghaznavid Empire. His four sons entered into the military service of Sultan Muhammad of Ghor and received twelve fiefs in Punjab, then a part of the Ghor Empire, as reward for their service. Thus the dynasty became quickly established as Nobles of the Sword in ancient India, a status they held under several different empires. They held a particularly high status under the Sultanate of Delhi. When the Chief of the Barha, who was also the Diwan of the empire, was granted the fief of Saharanpur due to his relation with the imperial family. They also enjoyed particularly prominent positions under the reign of the Sur, eventually defecting during the last days in the reign of Sikander Sur of the Sur Empire, to the Emperor Akbar of the Mughal Empire in the course of the siege of Mankot .

The Barha dynasty maintains the unique status of having been the only dynasty to participate in all three Battles of Panipat, seminal battles which shaped Indian History. Under the Lodi in the First Battle of Panipat. In the Second Battle of Panipat they gained victory under Bairam Khan, and finally in the Third Battle Of Panipat, the sons of Nawab Ali Muhammad Khan Rohilla fought with Ahmed Shah Abidali against the Maratha.

By the time of the Emperor Aurangzeb, the dynasty was firmly regarded as "Old Nobility" and enjoyed the unique status of holding the premier realms of Ajmer and Dakhin. Realms usually reserved for the rule of members of the Imperial Family.

He claimed to belong to the family of Sayyids or the descendants of the Prophet Muhammad through his daughter Fatima and son-in-law and cousin Ali who belonged to the Banu Hashim Clan of the Quraish Tribe.

Biography  

Abdullah Khan Barha served in the succession war between Aurangzeb and his Brother Dara Shikoh, on the side of Dara. After Dara's defeat, the Emperor Aurangzeb pardoned Abdullah Khan and allowed him to continue his military service in allegiance to him.

Abdullah Khan rose to fame during the Siege of Bijapur and afterwards was made the first Subedar of Bijapur. He later came to be made the Subedar of Ajmer and granted the title of "Sayyid Mian" by the Emperor Aurangzeb. His sons Hassan Ali Khan and Hussain Ali Khan served with the Imperial Prince of Azim-U-Shan son of the Imperial Prince Mu'azzam. After helping Mu'azzam ascend to the throne of Delhi as Bahdur Shah I. The new emperor awarded the bravery of the brothers for their service in the Battle of Agra, 1707, by giving them the Subedari of Allahbad and latter Patna.

References 

Mughal Empire